Petchyindee Academy is a Muay Thai gym located in Bangkok. It is owned by Nuttadaj Vachirarattanawong. It is the only Muay Thai gym in Thailand to apply Sport Science to improve their fighters' potential.

Notable Fighters
Petchdam Petchyindee Academy
Phetmorakot Petchyindee Academy
Praewprao PetchyindeeAcademy
Capitan Petchyindee Academy
Savvas Michael

References

Muay Thai in Thailand
Kickboxing training facilities